Engdewu, also known as Nanggu or Nagu, is one of two Reefs – Santa Cruz languages spoken on Nendö Island (the other is Santa Cruz).

Names
The language used to be known by outsiders as Nanggu, from the name of one of the villages where it is still spoken. This name is also spelled Nangu or Nagu.

The local population prefers to name the language Engdewu, after the name of the ancient village where it was initially spoken. This name has now been adopted by linguists.

Grammar
A description of the language was produced in 2013 by linguist Anders Vaa.

Phonology

Vowels
Nanggu has ten phonemic vowels.

Notes

References

External links 
 Materials on Nanggu are included in the open access Arthur Capell (AC2) and Stephen Wurm (SAW2) collections held by Paradisec

Languages of the Solomon Islands
Temotu languages